The 2009 All-Ireland Minor Hurling Championship was the 78th staging of the All-Ireland Minor Hurling Championship since its establishment by the Gaelic Athletic Association in 1928. The championship began on 12 April 2009 and ended on 6 September 2009.

Kilkenny entered the championship as the defending champions.

On 6 September 2009, Galway won the championship after a 2-15 to 2-11 defeat of Kilkenny in the All-Ireland final. This was their 8th championship title overall and their first title since 2005.

Tipperary's John O'Dwyer was the championship's top scorer with 4-37.

Results

Leinster Minor Hurling Championship

Round 1

Round 2

Quarter-finals

Round 3

Semi-finals

Final

Munster Minor Hurling Championship

First round

Playoff

Semi-finals

Final

Ulster Minor Hurling Championship

First round

Quarter-finals

Semi-finals

Final

All-Ireland Minor Hurling Championship

Quarter-finals

Semi-finals

Final

Championship statistics

Top scorers

Top scorer overall

Miscellaneous

 Waterford won the Munster Championship for the first time since 1992.

References

Minor
All-Ireland Minor Hurling Championship